Endoclita albofasciatus is a species of moth of the family Hepialidae. It is known from India.

References

External links
Hepialidae genera

Moths described in 1879
Hepialidae